Park Township is a civil township of Ottawa County in the U.S. state of Michigan.  As of the 2020 census, the township population was 18,625.

History
Park Township was originally part of Holland Township.  It was part of Holland Township in 1912.  Park Township was established in 1915.

Communities
Macatawa is a small unincorporated community near Lake Michigan on Lake Macatawa that once was home to resorts catering to visitors from Chicago. Nearly all of these resorts were destroyed in several fires. It is now home to cottages only.
 Waukazoo Woods is a neighborhood on the north shore of Lake Macatawa. Present day Waukazoo Woods was formerly an Ottawa Indian village,  which was led by Chief Waukazoo.  In the early 1900s, Wauakazoo, a popular summer destination for tourists, was home to the Waukazoo Inn, a  hotel.   The Waukazoo Inn was demolished in 1960, being replaced by private homes.

Geography
The southernmost part of the township is completely separated from the rest by Lake Macatawa.

Demographics
As of the census of 2000, there were 17,579 people, 6,113 households, and 4,951 families residing in the township. The racial makeup of the township was 93.55% White, 0.45% African American, 0.18% Native American, 2.14% Asian, 0.02% Pacific Islander, 2.18% from other races, and 1.48% from two or more races. Hispanic or Latino of any race were 5.46% of the population.

There were 6,113 households, out of which 41.8% had children under the age of 18 living with them, 73.2% were married couples living together, 5.7% had a female householder with no husband present, and 19.0% were non-families. 15.6% of all households were made up of individuals, and 4.1% had someone living alone who was 65 years of age or older.  The average household size was 2.87 and the average family size was 3.22.

In the township the population was spread out, with 30.9% under the age of 18, 6.4% from 18 to 24, 30.4% from 25 to 44, 24.6% from 45 to 64, and 7.7% who were 65 years of age or older.  The median age was 35 years. For every 100 females, there were 100.2 males.  For every 100 females age 18 and over, there were 98.7 males.

The median income for a household in the township was $65,328, and the median income for a family was $72,647. Males had a median income of $51,124 versus $31,486 for females. The per capita income for the township was $28,777.  About 1.4% of families and 2.6% of the population were below the poverty line, including 2.6% of those under age 18 and 0.6% of those age 65 or over.

Education 
 West Ottawa High School North Campus
 Lakeshore Elementary School

References

External links
Park Township

Townships in Ottawa County, Michigan
1915 establishments in Michigan
Townships in Michigan